is a passenger railway station located in the town of Masaki, Iyo District, Ehime Prefecture, Japan. It is operated by JR Shikoku and has the station number "U03".

Lines
Only Yosan Line local trains stop at the station and these ply the sectors  -  via  or  -  via the Uchiko branch. Connections with other services are needed to travel further east of Matsuyama.

Layout
The station consists of a side platform serving a single track. The platform is equipped with a weather shelter and a "tickets corner", a small shelter housing an automatic ticket vending machine. A ramp leads up to the platform from the access road. Near the base of the ramp, a waiting room has been set up and there is a designated parking area for bicycles.

History
Japanese National Railways (JNR) opened the station as a new stop on the existing Yosan Line on 15 April 1961. With the privatization of JNR on 1 April 1987, control of the station passed to JR Shikoku.

Surrounding area
The surrounding area is a rural area. Although it is located in Masaki, it is close to the border with Iyo City, and more people use it from the Shimomiya district of Iyo, which has a large population.

See also
 List of railway stations in Japan

References

External links
 Station timetable

Railway stations in Ehime Prefecture
Railway stations in Japan opened in 1961
Masaki, Ehime